Pilibhit is a city in Pilibhit district, Uttar Pradesh, India.

Pilibhit may also be refer to:
Pilibhit (Lok Sabha constituency)
Pilibhit district, a district in Uttar Pradesh, India

See also
Pilibhit District - Vidhan Sabha Constituencies
 Pilibhit Tiger Reserve